Harry Edward Ralph (21 May 1919 – 17 July 2004) was an Australian rules footballer who played with Essendon in the Victorian Football League (VFL) and  in the South Australian National Football League (SANFL). 

Ralph's career with Norwood was interrupted by his service in the Australian Army and then the Royal Australian Air Force during World War II. It was while serving in Melbourne with the RAAF that Ralph played four games for Essendon.

Ralph's last senior game for Norwood was their 1946 Grand Final victory over Port Adelaide, though he continued playing in the club's reserves until 1949. He later played for Cleve and coached various country football clubs, including Kingscote, Burra, Quorn, Orroroo and Bute.

Ralph worked as a manager for the State Bank of South Australia, retiring in 1980.

Notes

External links 
		

Essendon Football Club past player profile
Redlegs Museum profile 

1919 births
2004 deaths
Australian rules footballers from South Australia
Essendon Football Club players
Norwood Football Club players
Australian bankers
Australian Army personnel of World War II
Australian Army officers
Royal Australian Air Force personnel of World War II
Royal Australian Air Force officers